Parking minimums and parking maximums, also jointly known as parking requirements, are policy decisions, usually taken by municipal governments, which require new developments to provide a particular number of parking spaces.

Minimums 
In North America, parking minimums are requirements, as dictated by a municipality's zoning ordinance, for all new developments to provide a set number of off-street parking spots. These minimums look to cover the demand for parking generated by said development at the peak times. Thus different land uses, whether they be commercial, residential or industrial, have different requirements to meet when deriving the number of parking spots needed.

U.S. cities use Parking Generation Rates, a guidebook of statistical data from the Institute of Transportation Engineers, to source parking minimums. In these reports, the ITE define a type of land use's Parking Generation through an observational study. Parking Generation is found by the land uses, average generation rate, the range of generation rates, the subsequent standard deviation, and the total number of studies. This process is done by various studies to find the range. In the case of ITE studies, the observation of a single site multiple times is considered a stand-alone study. Then the average of the range is used to determine the average parking generation rate of a land use. This handbook is updated every 5 years to determine the demand for parking for specific land uses. Parking Generation Rates provided by the ITE doesn’t explicitly state what parking minimums should be, but rather is just a collection of statistical data for urban planners to interpret and use for at their own volition. Regardless, ITE's Parking Generation has been an influential factor In most North American cities in the adoption parking ratios, according to land use, to determine the minimum spots required by new developments.

Parking Generation, regardless of its widespread use in North American cities, is disputed as a tool to determine parking minimums due to its questionable statistical validity. Statistical significance is a major qualm with Parking Generations due to the oversimplification of how the parking generation rate is derived. Peak parking observed by ITE doesn’t take into account the price of parking in relation to the number of parked cars. Thus the demand at any given time for parking is always high because it is oversupplied and underpriced, resulting in an infalted calculation for the parking generation rate of a land use. Parking minimums also often fail to take into account nearby parking, requiring businesses with peak patronage at different times of day to both build out the largest possible lots.

UCLA Professor Donald Shoup has called parking minimums a "pseudosicence", as the ITE's calculations are typically based on minimal data and approximations that cannot be widely applied to other businesses, even of the same type. Many businesses have been forced to build parking lots that are never full even on the busiest days. Before it eliminated parking minimums for new developments in 2022, San Jose, California, had a requirement for bowling alleys have seven parking spots per lane, assuming that all would be in use by a full party that all drove separately. For the broad use of "Recreation, commercial (indoor), the city required one parking spot per 80 square feet of recreational area, regardless of the expected number of users coming by car. A restaurant had to build a parking lot eight times the size of the restaurant itself. 

Adoption of parking minimums by municipalities, base on ratios from Parking Generation had a substantial effect on urban form. This can be seen in the lack of density characterized by the suburbanization of North America post-World War II. The growth of the car industry and car culture, in general, has much to do with the mass movement of the middle-class away from urban centers and exterior of the city in single family detached homes. As populations grew and density dissipated automobiles became the main mode of transportation. Thus insuring that new developments insured off-street park became a necessity.

Parking minimums shift the cost of parking from users to developers and make construction costs much more expensive. A parking structure costs an average of $28,000 per spot, excluding the cost of land. Of the $274 million it cost to build the Walt Disney Concert Hall in Los Angeles, $100 million was for the underground parking garage.

Parking minimums are also set for parallel, pull-in, or diagonal parking, depending on what types of vehicles are allowed to park in the lot or a particular section of it. According to the American Planning Association's report on parking standards, "In particular, off-street parking standards are an attempt to minimize spillover parking on public streets and to ensure safe and efficient movement of traffic by requiring that the supply of parking at the site of the development is adequate to meet
demand."

In recognition of the many problems parking minimums cause, since 2017 many U.S. cities have overhauled or entirely repealed their parking minimum laws.

Maximums 
In Europe, parking maximums are more common. As a condition of planning permission for a new development, the development must be designed so that a minimum percentage of visitors arrive by public transport. The number of parking places in the development is limited to a number less than the expected number of visitors.

Climate implications 
Recently parking minimums have become a focus for climate change and affordable housing activists, as it has become apparent that a high proportion of urban land use is allocated for cars as a result of these policies. Environmentalists are now urging urban planners to design for a society which is moving away from private transportation and to promote public transport by design.  For example, in 2006 the Department for Communities and Local Government of United Kingdom publish "policies in development plans should set maximum levels of parking for broad classes of development". In September 2022, the U.S. state of California issued a ban on parking minimums for buildings within  of public transit.

See also 

 Single-family zoning, another policy increasingly blamed for housing costs and climate impacts

References

External links
 Map of parking minimums in U.S. cities
 Parking Generation – Institute of Transportation Engineers

Parking law